Matthew Wayne Shepard (December 1, 1976 – October 12, 1998) was a gay American student at the University of Wyoming who was beaten, tortured, and left to die near Laramie on the night of October 6, 1998. He was taken by rescuers to Poudre Valley Hospital in Fort Collins, Colorado, where he died six days later from severe head injuries received during the attack.

Suspects Aaron McKinney and Russell Henderson were arrested shortly after the attack and charged with first-degree murder following Shepard's death. Significant media coverage was given to the murder and what role Shepard's sexual orientation played as a motive for the crime.

The prosecutor argued that the murder of Shepard was premeditated and driven by greed. McKinney's defense counsel countered by arguing that he had intended only to rob Shepard but killed him in a rage when Shepard made a sexual advance toward him. McKinney's girlfriend told police that he had been motivated by anti-gay sentiment but later recanted her statement, saying that she had lied because she thought it would help him. Both McKinney and Henderson were convicted of the murder, and each of them received two consecutive life sentences.

Shepard's murder brought national and international attention to hate crime legislation at both the state and federal level. In October 2009, the United States Congress passed the Matthew Shepard and James Byrd Jr. Hate Crimes Prevention Act (commonly the "Matthew Shepard Act" or "Shepard/Byrd Act" for short), and on October 28, 2009, President Barack Obama signed the legislation into law.

Following her son's murder, Judy Shepard became a gay rights activist and established the Matthew Shepard Foundation. Shepard's murder inspired films, novels, plays, songs, and other works.

Background
Matthew Shepard was born in 1976 in Casper, Wyoming; he was the first of two sons born to Judy (née Peck) and Dennis Shepard. His younger brother, Logan, was born in 1981. The two brothers had a close relationship. Shepard attended Crest Hill Elementary School, Dean Morgan Junior High School, and Natrona County High School for his freshman through junior years. As a child, he was "friendly with all his classmates", but was targeted and teased due to his small stature and lack of athleticism. He developed an interest in politics at an early age.

Saudi Aramco hired his father in the summer of 1994, and Shepard's parents subsequently resided at the Saudi Aramco Residential Camp in Dhahran. During that time, Shepard attended the American School in Switzerland (TASIS), from which he graduated in May 1995. There, he participated in theater, and took German and Italian courses. He then attended Catawba College in North Carolina and Casper College in Wyoming, before settling in Denver, Colorado. Shepard became a first-year political science major at the University of Wyoming in Laramie with a minor in languages, and was chosen as the student representative for the Wyoming Environmental Council.

Shepard was an Episcopalian and once served as an altar boy in the church. He was described by his father as "an optimistic and accepting young man who had a special gift of relating to almost everyone. He was the type of person who was very approachable and always looked to new challenges. Shepard had a great passion for equality and always stood up for the acceptance of people's differences." Michele Josue, who had been Shepard's friend and later created a documentary about him, Matt Shepard Is a Friend of Mine, described him as "a tenderhearted and kind person."

In 1995, Shepard was beaten and raped during a high school trip to Morocco. This caused him to experience depression and panic attacks, according to his mother. One of Shepard's friends feared that his depression had driven him to become involved with drugs during his time at college. Multiple times, Shepard was hospitalized due to his clinical depression and suicidal ideation.

Murder

On the night of October 6, 1998, Shepard was approached by Aaron McKinney and Russell Henderson at the Fireside Lounge in Laramie; all three men were in their early 20s. McKinney and Henderson offered to give Shepard a ride home. They subsequently drove to a remote rural area and proceeded to rob, pistol-whip, and torture Shepard, tying him to a barbed-wire fence and leaving him to die. Many media reports contained the graphic account of the pistol-whipping and his fractured skull. Reports described how Shepard was beaten so brutally that his face was completely covered in blood, except where it had been partially cleansed by his tears.

The assailants' girlfriends testified that neither McKinney nor Henderson was under the influence of alcohol or other drugs at the time of the attack. McKinney and Henderson testified that they learned of Shepard's address and intended to steal from his home as well. After attacking Shepard and leaving him tied to the fence in near-freezing temperatures, McKinney and Henderson returned to town. McKinney proceeded to pick a fight with two men, 19-year-old Emiliano Morales and 18-year-old Jeremy Herrara. The fight resulted in head wounds for both Morales and McKinney. Police officer Flint Waters arrived at the scene of the fight. He arrested Henderson, searched McKinney's truck, and found a blood-smeared gun along with Shepard's shoes and credit card. Henderson and McKinney later tried to persuade their girlfriends to provide alibis for them and help them dispose of evidence.

Still tied to the fence, Shepard was in a coma eighteen hours after the attack when he was discovered by Aaron Kreifels, a cyclist who initially mistook Shepard for a scarecrow. Reggie Fluty, the first police officer to arrive at the scene, found Shepard alive but covered in blood. Shepard was transported first to Ivinson Memorial Hospital in Laramie before being moved to the more advanced trauma ward at Poudre Valley Hospital in Fort Collins, Colorado. He had suffered fractures to the back of his head and in front of his right ear. He experienced severe brainstem damage, which affected his body's ability to regulate his heart rate, body temperature, and other vital functions. There were also about a dozen small lacerations around his head, face, and neck. His injuries were deemed too severe for doctors to operate. Shepard never regained consciousness and remained on full life support. While he lay in intensive care and in the days following the attack, candlelight vigils were held in countries around the world.

Shepard was pronounced dead six days after the attack at 12:53 a.m. on October 12, 1998. He was 21 years old.

Arrests and trial
McKinney and Henderson were arrested and initially charged with attempted murder, kidnapping, and aggravated robbery. After Shepard's death, the charges were upgraded from attempted murder to first-degree murder, which meant that the two defendants were eligible for the death penalty. Their girlfriends, Kristen Price and Chasity Pasley, were charged with being accessories after the fact. At McKinney's November 1998 pretrial hearing, Sergeant Rob Debree testified that McKinney had stated in an interview on October 9 that he and Henderson had identified Shepard as a robbery target and pretended to be gay to lure him out to their truck, and that McKinney had attacked Shepard after Shepard put his hand on McKinney's knee. Detective Ben Fritzen testified that Price stated McKinney told her the violence against Shepard was triggered by how McKinney "[felt] about gays".

In December 1998, Pasley pleaded guilty to being an accessory after the fact to first-degree murder. On April 5, 1999, Henderson avoided going to trial when he pleaded guilty to murder and kidnapping charges. In order to avoid the death penalty, he agreed to testify against McKinney and was sentenced by District Judge Jeffrey A. Donnell to two consecutive life terms. At Henderson's sentencing, his lawyer argued that Shepard had not been targeted because he was gay.

McKinney's trial took place in October and November 1999. Prosecutor Cal Rerucha alleged that McKinney and Henderson pretended to be gay to gain Shepard's trust. Price, McKinney's girlfriend, testified that Henderson and McKinney had "pretended they were gay to get [Shepard] in the truck and rob him." McKinney's lawyer attempted to put forward a gay panic defense, arguing that McKinney was driven to temporary insanity by alleged sexual advances by Shepard. This defense was rejected by the judge. McKinney's lawyer stated that the two men wanted to rob Shepard but never intended to kill him. Rerucha argued that the killing had been premeditated, driven by "greed and violence", rather than by Shepard's sexual orientation. The jury found McKinney not guilty of premeditated murder but guilty of felony murder and began to deliberate on the death penalty. Shepard's parents brokered a deal that resulted in McKinney receiving two consecutive life terms without the possibility of parole. Henderson and McKinney were incarcerated in the Wyoming State Penitentiary in Rawlins and were later transferred to other prisons because of overcrowding. Following her testimony at McKinney's trial, Price pleaded guilty to a reduced charge of misdemeanor interference with a police officer.

Subsequent reporting

20/20
Shepard's murder continued to attract public attention and media coverage long after the trial was over. In 2004, the ABC News news program 20/20 aired a report that quoted statements by McKinney, Henderson, Price, Rerucha, and a lead investigator. The statements alleged that the murder had not been motivated by Shepard's sexuality but was primarily a drug-related robbery that had turned violent. Price said she had lied to police about McKinney having been provoked by an unwanted sexual advance from Shepard, telling TV journalist Elizabeth Vargas, "I don't think it was a hate crime at all." Rerucha said, "It was a murder that was once again driven by drugs."

The Book of Matt

Stephen Jimenez, the producer of the 2004 20/20 segment, went on to write a book, The Book of Matt: Hidden Truths About the Murder of Matthew Shepard, which was published in September 2013.  The book said that Shepard and McKinney—the killer who inflicted the injuries—had been occasional sex partners and that Shepard was a methamphetamine dealer. Jimenez wrote that Fritzen told an interviewer "Matthew Shepard's sexual preference or sexual orientation certainly wasn't the motive in the homicide...".

Many commentators have criticized Jimenez's views on the attack as being sensational and misleading; those views were shared by gay advocacy organizations and cultural critics. Some commentators, however, have spoken up to defend it. Some police that were involved in the investigation have criticized Jimenez's conclusions, while other police said that there was evidence that drugs were an important factor that led to the murder.

Anti-gay protests
Members of the Westboro Baptist Church, led by Fred Phelps, received national attention for picketing  Shepard's funeral with signs bearing homophobic slogans, such as "Matt in Hell" and "God Hates Fags".

Church members also mounted anti-gay protests during the trials of Henderson and McKinney. In response, Romaine Patterson, one of Shepard's friends, organized a group that assembled in a circle around the Westboro Baptist Church protesters. The group wore white robes and gigantic wings (resembling angels) that blocked the protesters. Despite this action, Shepard's parents were still able to hear the protesters shouting anti-gay remarks and comments directed towards them. The police intervened and created a human barrier between the two groups. Angel Action was founded by Patterson in April 1999.

Legacy
In the years following her son's death, Judy Shepard has worked as an advocate for LGBT rights, particularly issues relating to gay youth. She was a main force behind the Matthew Shepard Foundation, which she and her husband, Dennis, founded in December 1998.

Gay rights activist John Stoltenberg has said that to portray Shepard as a gay-bashing victim is to present an incomplete account of his victimization: "Keeping Matthew as the poster boy of gay-hate crime and ignoring the full tragedy of his story has been the agenda of many gay-movement leaders.  Ignoring the tragedies of Matthew's life prior to his murder will do nothing to help other young men in our community who are sold for sex, ravaged by drugs, and generally exploited."

In June 2019, Shepard was one of the inaugural fifty American "pioneers, trailblazers, and heroes" inducted on the National LGBTQ Wall of Honor within the Stonewall National Monument (SNM) in New York City's Stonewall Inn. The SNM is the first U.S. national monument dedicated to LGBTQ rights and history, and the wall's unveiling was timed to take place during the 50th anniversary of the Stonewall riots.

Hate crime legislation

Requests for new legislation to address hate crimes gained momentum during coverage of the incident. Under existing United States federal law and Wyoming state law, crimes committed on the basis of sexual orientation could not be prosecuted as hate crimes.

A few hours after Shepard was discovered, his friends Walt Boulden and Alex Trout began to contact media organizations, claiming that Shepard had been assaulted because he was gay. According to prosecutor Cal Rerucha, "They were calling the County Attorney's office, they were calling the media and indicating Matthew Shepard is gay and we don't want the fact that he is gay to go unnoticed."  Tina Labrie, a  close friend of Shepard's, said "[Boulden and Trout] wanted to make [Matt] a poster child or something for their cause".  Boulden linked the attack to the absence of a Wyoming criminal statute providing for a hate crimes charge.

In the following session of the Wyoming Legislature, a bill was introduced that defined certain attacks motivated by a victim's sexual orientation as hate crimes. The measure failed on a 30–30 tie in the Wyoming House of Representatives.

President Bill Clinton renewed attempts to extend federal hate crime legislation to include gay people, women, and people with disabilities. A Hate Crimes Prevention Act was introduced in both the United States Senate and House of Representatives in November 1997, and reintroduced in March 1999, but was passed by only the Senate in July 1999. In September 2000, both houses of Congress passed such legislation; however, it was stripped out in conference committee.

On March 20, 2007, the Matthew Shepard and James Byrd Jr. Hate Crimes Prevention Act was introduced as federal bipartisan legislation in the U.S. Congress, sponsored by Democrat John Conyers with 171 co-sponsors. Shepard's parents attended the introduction ceremony. The bill passed the House of Representatives on May 3, 2007. Similar legislation passed in the Senate on September 27, 2007, however then-President George W. Bush indicated he would veto the legislation if it reached his desk. The Democratic leadership dropped the amendment in response to opposition from conservative groups and Bush, and because the measure was attached to a defense bill there was a lack of support from antiwar Democrats. On December 10, 2007, congressional powers attached bipartisan hate crimes legislation to a Department of Defense Authorization bill, although it failed to pass. Nancy Pelosi, Speaker of the House, said she was "still committed to getting the Matthew Shepard Act passed". Pelosi planned to get the bill passed in early 2008 although she did not succeed. Following his election as president, Barack Obama stated that he was committed to passing the Act.

The U.S. House of Representatives debated expansion of hate crimes legislation on April 29, 2009. During the debate, Representative Virginia Foxx of North Carolina called the "hate crime" labeling of Shepard's murder a "hoax". Foxx later called her comments "a poor choice of words". The House passed the act, designated , by a vote of 249 to 175. Ted Kennedy, Patrick Leahy, and a bipartisan coalition introduced the bill in the Senate on April 28; it had 43 cosponsors as of June 17, 2009. The Matthew Shepard Act was adopted as an amendment to S.1390 by a vote of 63–28 on July 15, 2009. On October 22, 2009, the Senate passed the act by a vote of 68–29. President Obama signed the measure into law on October 28, 2009.

Interment in Washington National Cathedral

On October 26, 2018, just over 20 years after his death, Shepard's ashes were interred at the crypt of Washington National Cathedral. The ceremony was presided over by the first openly gay Episcopal bishop Gene Robinson, and the Bishop of Washington Reverend Marianne Edgar Budde. Music was performed by the Gay Men's Chorus of Washington DC, GenOUT, and Conspirare, which performed Craig Hella Johnson's Considering Matthew Shepard. His was the first interment of the ashes of a national figure at the cathedral since Helen Keller's fifty years earlier.

In popular culture

Matthew Shepard's life, death, trial, and its aftermath have inspired numerous works, including documentary and narrative films and television shows, stage plays (such as The Laramie Project), and musical and written works. Additionally, NBA player Jason Collins wore the jersey number "98" in honor of Shepard during his 2012–13 season with the Boston Celtics and the Washington Wizards, and would come out as gay following the season. After Collins joined the Brooklyn Nets in 2014, NBA marketing reported high interest in his "98" jersey and high sales once the item became available for purchase.

The Meaning of Matthew, its full title The Meaning of Matthew: My Son's Murder in Laramie, and a World Transformed, is a 2009 biographical book by Judy Shepard about her son. Judy Shepard speaks about her loss, her family memories of Matthew, and the tragic event that changed the Shepards' lives and America. The Meaning of Matthew follows the Shepard family in the days immediately after the crime to see their incapacitated son, kept alive by life support machines; how the Shepards learned of the huge public response, the candlelit vigils and memorial services for their child; and their struggles to navigate the legal system.

See also
 Violence against LGBT people

References

Further reading

External links
 Matthew Shepard Web Archive at the University of Wyoming's American Heritage Center
 Matthew Shepard collection at the University of Wyoming's American Heritage Center
 Matthew Shepard Foundation
 Matthew Shepard Resource Site at the University of Wyoming 
 The Celebration of Life and Interment for Matthew Wayne Shepard

 
1976 births
1998 deaths
1998 murders in the United States
20th-century American Episcopalians
20th-century American LGBT people
American torture victims
American gay men
American victims of anti-LGBT hate crimes
Burials at Washington National Cathedral
Casper College alumni
Catawba College alumni
Christians from Wyoming
Deaths by beating in the United States
LGBT Anglicans
LGBT people from Wyoming
Murdered American students
People from Casper, Wyoming
People from Laramie, Wyoming
People murdered in Wyoming
People with HIV/AIDS
University of Wyoming alumni
Violence against LGBT people in the United States
Violence against men in North America